The KNVB Cup 1972–73 (55th edition) started on October 29, 1972. The final was held on May 31, 1973, with NAC beating NEC 2–0 and winning the cup for the first time.

Teams
 All 18 participants of the Eredivisie 1972-73, entering in the second round
 All 20 participants of the Eerste Divisie 1972-73
 8 teams from lower (amateur) leagues

First round 

1 Eerste Divisie; A Amateur teams

Second round 
The 18 Eredivisie teams entered this round.

E Eredivisie

Third round

From quarterfinals to final 

NAC would participate in the Cup Winners' Cup.

See also
Eredivisie 1972-73
Eerste Divisie 1972-73

External links
 Netherlands Cup Full Results 1970–1994

KNVB Cup seasons
Knvb Cup, 1972-73
Knvb Cup, 1972-73